Adilson de Freitas Nascimento, also commonly known as Adilson Nascimento, or simply Adilson (3 December 1951 – 3 February 2009), was a Brazilian professional basketball player. He died in 2009 due to cancer.

Professional career
During his pro club career, Nascimento won the Brazilian Championship, in the year 1973, with Vila Nova.

National team career
With the senior Brazilian national basketball team, Nascimento competed at the following major world tournaments: the 1972 Summer Olympics, the 1974 FIBA World Cup, the 1978 FIBA World Cup, the 1980 Summer Olympics, the 1982 FIBA World Cup, and the 1984 Summer Olympics.

References

1951 births
2009 deaths
Brazilian men's basketball players
1974 FIBA World Championship players
1978 FIBA World Championship players
1982 FIBA World Championship players
Basketball players at the 1972 Summer Olympics
Basketball players at the 1980 Summer Olympics
Basketball players at the 1984 Summer Olympics
Centers (basketball)
Franca Basquetebol Clube players
Olympic basketball players of Brazil
Power forwards (basketball)
Sociedade Esportiva Palmeiras basketball players
Sport Club Corinthians Paulista basketball players
Basketball players from São Paulo
Vila Nova Basquete Clube players